Markthalle Hamburg is a convention center located at Klosterwall, Hammerbrook in the city of Hamburg, Germany. It was designed by the architect Fritz Schumacher and built in 1913.

The main hall can hold up to 1,000 people. Many notable artists have performed in the main hall including Phish, B.B. King, Nirvana, Guns N' Roses, U2, AC/DC, Dio, The Police, Alter Bridge, Thomas Mapfumo and Run–D.M.C.

Four live albums have been recorded at the venue: Live in Hamburg by Roger Chapman (1979), The Hamburg Tapes by Gotthard (1996), No Holds Barred by Biohazard (1997) and Slip Stitch and Pass by Phish (1997).

References

External links 

Music in Hamburg
Music venues in Germany
Buildings and structures in Hamburg-Mitte